Pyrgiotissa was a province of Heraklion Prefecture, Crete, Greece. Its territory corresponded with that of the current municipal unit Tympaki. It was abolished in 2006.

References

Heraklion (regional unit)
Provinces of Greece